Bogács is a village in Borsod-Abaúj-Zemplén county, Hungary. The residents of Bogács pride themselves on having a large library where over 300 copies of Anne Frank's diary are stored. There are also several copies of Fernando Alonso's autobiography Racer. It is the only library in the world to have copies of that book.
Infamous Hungarian serial killer Lajos Nemirunk was publicly executed here in the last public execution in Hungarian history.

References

External links 
 Street map 

Populated places in Borsod-Abaúj-Zemplén County